Eleotris vomerodentata is a species of fish in the family Eleotridae endemic to Madagascar, where it is only known to occur in fresh waters. Eleotris have similar features, generally, but there are ways to distinguish an Eleotris vomerodentata. The head, preoperculum, body and abdomen are beige to light brown. The fins are whitish-beige in color. The most common distinguishing feature is the presence of teeth in the vomer.

References
  3. Mennesson, M. (2020). Eleotris (Teleostei: Eleotridae) of the Indian Ocean: an overview with the description of three new species. Cybium, 44(3), 185–203. https://doi.org/10.26028/cybium/2020-443-002 

vomerodentata
Freshwater fish of Madagascar
Taxonomy articles created by Polbot
Fish described in 1984